Amegilla albiceps is a species of bee native to Australia. It has a southern temperate distribution, with records from South Australia and Victoria. A member of the genus Amegilla, it was described in 1951 by Tarlton Rayment. Adults have been found from October to March, and they have been observed visiting flowers of the mistletoe genus Amyema.

With a body length of approximately 14mm, Amegilla albiceps is roughly the same size as a worker honeybee. It has a white head, and a predominantly orange abdomen. The band of black hairs on the second abdominal segment is wider on the male than the female.

References 

Insects of Australia
Insects described in 1951
Apinae